Lotulelei is a surname. Notable people with the surname include:

John Lotulelei (born 1991), American football player
Star Lotulelei (born 1989), American football player, cousin of John